Greenwell is an English surname. Notable people with the surname include:

Arts and entertainment
 Dora Greenwell (1821–1882), English poet
 Emma Greenwell (born 1989), American actress
 Garth Greenwell (born 1978), American poet, author, literary critic, and educator
 Peter Greenwell (1929–2006), English composer and pianist

Sport
 Don Greenwell (1924–2002), English footballer, played one game for York City
 Jack Greenwell (1884–1942), English footballer and manager, notably for Barcelona
 Mike Greenwell (born 1963), American baseball player
 Rebecca Greenwell (born 1995), American basketball player
 Ross Greenwell (born 1998), English cricketer

Other
 Andrew Greenwell (born 1983), American real estate broker and reality TV personality
 Ashlee Greenwell (born 1988), American beauty queen
 Carlyle Greenwell (1884–1961), Australian architect
 George Clementson Greenwell (1821–1900), British mining engineer
 Harry Edward Greenwell (1944–2013), American serial killer
 Henry Nicholas Greenwell (1826–1891), English merchant who sold Kona coffee, founder of the Greenwell Store
 Joe Greenwell (born 1951), British business executive
 Leonard Greenwell (1781–1844), British Major-general
 Richard Greenwell (1942–2005), British cryptozoologist and explorer
 Thomas George Greenwell (1894–1967), British Member of Parliament
 Tom Greenwell (1956–2013), judge in the U.S. state of Texas
 William Greenwell (1820–1918), English archaeologist and Church of England priest

See also
 Amy B. H. Greenwell Ethnobotanical Garden, Hawaii, U.S.
 Greenwell baronets, a title in the Baronetage of the United Kingdom, created in 1906
 Greenwell Glacier, Antarctica
 Greenwell Matongo, a suburb in the city of Windhoek, Namibia
 Greenwell Point, New South Wales, an inhabited place in Australia
 Greenwell Springs, Louisiana, an unincorporated community in the U.S. state of Louisiana
 Greenwell State Park, in the U.S. state of Maryland
 Greenwell Store, a historic building in the U.S. state of Hawaii
 Kent Budden & Greenwell, an Australian architectural practice in Sydney, New South Wales 1913–1919